John F. D. Spence (2 October 1875 – 20 February 1946) was British sailing competitor at the 1908 Summer Olympics. Sources also give his name as James Fleming Drever Spence.

He was a crew member on the Mouchette which finished second of two teams competing in the 12 metre class. At the time, only the helmsman and mate were awarded silver medals, while the crew received bronze medals. However, Spence is credited as having received a silver medal in the official Olympic database.

References

External links
 
 

1875 births
1946 deaths
British male sailors (sport)
Olympic sailors of Great Britain
Olympic silver medallists for Great Britain
Olympic medalists in sailing
Medalists at the 1908 Summer Olympics
Sailors at the 1908 Summer Olympics – 12 Metre